Glasses is a live album by multi-instrumentalist and composer Joe McPhee, recorded in 1977 and first released on the Swiss HatHut label 1979.

Reception

Allmusic gave the album 3 stars.

Track listing 
All compositions by Joe McPhee except as indicated
 "Glasses" - 18:30
 "Naima" (John Coltrane) - 8:10
 "New Potatoes" - 15:25

Personnel 
Joe McPhee - tenor saxophone
Reto Weber - percussion

References 

Joe McPhee live albums
1979 live albums
Hathut Records live albums